Prostitution in Tunisia is regulated and confined to two small areas, one in Sfax and the other, Sidi Abdallah Guech in Tunis. Outside these two areas prostitution is illegal.

Although the number of registered prostitutes is low, many work illegally, especially since the closure of most of the red-light districts as a consequence of the Jasmine Revolution in 2011. UNAIDS estimate there to be around 25,000 prostitutes in the country. Sex workers and NGOs report law enforcement to be abusive, inconsistent and corrupt.

History
During the Ottoman period in Tunisia, prostitutes were taxed according to appearance; the better looking the woman the more she had to pay.

Tunisia became a French Protectorate in 1881. In 1883 the La Marsa Convention made French law applicable in Tunisia. At that time brothels and prostitution were legal in France and therefore also in Tunisia. The first maison de tolérance (brothel) appeared in Tunis in   1882. In 1889, a regularity system was introduced, and biweekly medical examinations for prostitutes were made mandatory to try and stop the spread of syphilis.

During the German occupation of France in WWII, the Vichy Government was pressured into further regulating prostitution to try and prevent the spread of STIs amongst German troops. Still controlled by Vichy France, the Tunisian government legalised the status of sex workers as "fonctionnaires" (civil servants) in 1942. Those issued with a fonctionnaires licence were subject to strict regulation. Without a licence, prostitution became illegal. Clients of illegal prostitutes were also criminalised as accomplices. Regulated areas of prostitution were present in most cities.

After Tunisia was occupied by Axis forces in WWII, as in other occupied territories, military brothels were set up, often using interned Jews.

In 1977, the Tunisian Ministry of the Interior amended the 1942 decree to reflect the social and legislative developments the country had undergone.

Jasmine Revolution
Prior to the 2011 Jasmine Revolution, there were around 300 legal sex workers in about 12 areas including Tunis, Sfax, Sousse, Gabès and Kairouan. Following the Revolution, the Islamist government turned a blind eye to fundamentalist action against the red light districts. Many were burnt down; in others the prostitutes were evicted and the buildings wrecked. All but those in Tunis and Sfax were closed, those two being saved by the action of locals preventing the fundamentalists entering the areas until police and military arrived.

In 2014 there was a petition to the Ministry of the Interior to allow the red light district in Sousse to reopen but this was unsuccessful.

Legislation

Regulated
Regulations for prostitution and brothels were introduced by a Ministry of the Interior decree on April 30, 1942:
 Sex workers need to register and be licensed as fonctionnaires (civil servants)
 Prostitution can only take place in designated areas
 Prostitutes may work independently or in brothels
 Prostitutes may not leave the designated areas except by permit
 Twice weekly medical examinations for STIs are mandatory
 Taxes must be paid
 Time off is only allowed for menstruation
 Sex workers are not allowed to engage in any other occupation
 The use of condoms is compulsory
 Patronnes of brothels must be female, over 35 and have the permission of their husband

Non-Regulated
Article 231 of The Penal Code:

Generally clients are dealt with less severely, and usually only fined.

Sex trafficking

Tunisia is a source, destination, and possible transit country for men, women, and children subjected to sex trafficking. According to a baseline study published in 2013, Tunisian youth are subjected to various forms of trafficking. International organizations report an increased presence of street children and rural children working to support their families in Tunisia since the 2011 revolution; according to the baseline study, these children are vulnerable to sex trafficking. Tunisian women have reportedly been forced into prostitution under false promises of work both within the country and elsewhere in the region, such as Lebanon, United Arab Emirates, and Jordan. In 2016, the Ministry of Justice (MOJ) reported 22 prosecutions involving forced prostitution.

The United States Department of State Office to Monitor and Combat Trafficking in Persons ranks Tunisia as a "Tier 2" country.

References

Further reading
 
  
 
 
 
 
 
 

 
Society of Tunisia
Tunisia